Luis Fernando Ochoa (born August 16, 1968) is an American musician, composer, record producer, art producer, sound engineer, arranger and backing vocalist known for his works with artists such as Shakira, Chayanne, and Ricky Martin.

Biography
Luis Fernando Ochoa was born in New Orleans, Louisiana, United States on August 16, 1968. He lived in Chicago and at age 17 arrived in Medellin. From an early age, he became used to spending whole hours stuck to the sound system in which his parents heard songs from Elvis Presley, Engelbert Humperdinck and cumbias that they received from Colombia. Although not from a family with a great musical vein, his great-grandmother did play the piano very well and it was through that instrument that he began to discover the first notes.

Career
In the 70s he became a fan of rock and bands such as the Rolling Stones, Pink Floyd, and in Medellín he was part of the group Nash. Later in Bogotá he joined Compañía Ilimitada, which he was linked until 1990. Back in Medellín, he was part of Dloop and Lakesis, he started making music for advertising. His career as a producer started when a BMG label executive asked him what he was doing at Lakesis and, without knowing why, he replied: "I am the producer". Since then he started working as a producer, not only with Shakira but also with other Colombian artists like Jose Gaviria. Between 1996 and 1998 his life was between Mexico City and Los Angeles, and since 1998, when he worked with Shakira in the production of Dónde Están los Ladrones? he established in Miami. "It has not been easy, in Miami it is difficult to break that outline of noises, partying". For him, artists such as Bacilos, Polo Montañés, Juanes and Shakira have been very important because they have exposed the music made in Miami to the world and have shown that in variety is the pleasure of learning, making and listening to music. Ochoa received a nomination for Producer of the Year at the 4th Annual Latin Grammy Awards.

Discography
 1990: Nash – Nash
 1993: Compañía – Mascaras
 1995: Aura Christina – Calor 1995: Jose Gaviria – Camaleón 1996: Shakira – Pies Descalzos 1996: Shakira – The Remixes 1996: Terry Christian – Broken Hearts 1996: Jose Gaviria – Mundo Nuevo 1997: Federico Vega – Cápsulas de Amor 1998: Shakira – Dónde Están los Ladrones? 1999: Juan David – Juan David 1999: El Círculo – Murió El Silencio 2000: Niurka – Quiero Vivir 2000: Shakira – MTV Unplugged 
 2001: Shakira – Laundry Service 2002: Anasol – Astros 2002: Bacilos – Caraluna 
 2003: Julio Iglesias Jr. Tercera Dimensión 
 2003: Ricky Martin – Almas del Silencio 2005: Shakira – Fijación Oral Vol. 1 2005: Shakira – Oral Fixation Vol. 2 2010: Shakira – Sale el Sol 2014: Shakira – Shakira 2017: Shakira – El Dorado''

References

Colombian artists
Pop guitarists
Grammy Award winners
Latin Grammy Award winners
1968 births
Living people
Latin music record producers